Walter Reed Middle School is located in the Studio City neighborhood of Los Angeles, California, USA. Originally called North Hollywood Junior High School, the school was later renamed in honor of U.S. Army Major Walter Reed.

The school is a part of Local District North East of the Los Angeles Unified School District and feeds into North Hollywood High School. Several areas, including parts of North Hollywood, Valley Village, Studio City and Woodbridge Park, are zoned to Reed.

History
In 2017 the school received budget cuts since the percentage of non-Hispanic/Latino white students reached 30%; this occurred because of a state law established in the 1970s stating that schools with populations of white students below 30% get extra funding.

Academies and electives
The school offers a variety of special academic programs: the Individualized Honors Program (IHP), the School for Advanced Studies (SAS), the Humanities Academy, the Media Arts and Technology Academy, the S.T.E.A.M. Academy, the Environmental Sciences Academy, and the Global Leadership Academy. IHP was described by Time magazine as "perhaps the most successful junior-high curriculum in the U.S.". Founded in 1971 by William Fitz-Gibbon, the IHP's purpose is to serve the needs of highly gifted children. IHP students are usually one or two levels above average grade math classes. There is also an Honors program for every academy for Gifted and Talented children, which is one year above the regular curriculum (on average). Each academy brings something different, and specializes it’s learning to the way their students enjoy the most. Despite the disproportionate amount of IHP information, the Walter Reed Middle School website includes information about every academy. When selecting an academy, take time to make your decision, but you can also transfer academies at the end of each semester if you change your mind.

Electives-
There is a large variety of electives at Walter Reed. It ranges from Spanish and Latin, to Choir, Show Choir, to Wind, Percussion, String, to Cartooning and Animation, Architecture and Design, to the Cadet Corp, to Computers, Creative Writing, Environmental Studies, Robotics, Library TA and Office TA.

The school has a very active parent body organized under its PTSA.

Gifted program
In 1971, the school established the Individualized Honors Program (IHP) co-founded by William Fitz-Gibbon. The parents who place their children in the program want them to be social peers; the students would otherwise be able to skip middle school and enroll directly in high school or in some cases tertiary education.

Filming
Television shows filmed there include Head of the Class, Growing Pains, 7th Heaven, Parks and Recreation, Rowan & Martin's Laugh-In, CSI, Malcolm in the Middle, Parenthood, The West Wing, Tell Me You Love Me, Just Add Magic, and Grey's Anatomy.

Scenes from movies including Primary Colors, License to Drive, The Shaggy Dog, Role Models, Accepted and Scooby-Doo! Curse of the Lake Monster were also filmed there. In 2006, the fee for one day of filming at an LAUSD school was $2,500.

In the news
On May 26, 1998, a student brought a kitchen knife to school and stabbed and seriously injured another boy during an eighth-grade “Fun Day” event.

At the 2008 Republican National Convention in Saint Paul, Minnesota, the façade of Walter Reed Middle School was displayed behind the GOP nominee John McCain as a backdrop to his acceptance speech, leading to speculation that the campaign had intended to display a picture of Walter Reed Army Medical Center, the Army's leading medical institution and a facility widely associated with care for Iraq war veterans. Others speculated that it may have been used as a reference to the TV show The West Wing, which featured the character Matt Santos announcing his candidacy for president in front of the school.

The then principal of Walter Reed Middle School, Donna Tobin, placed a statement on the school's website saying that the school had not given permission for the footage to be used, "nor is the use of our school’s picture an endorsement of any political party or view."

References

External links

Schools in Los Angeles
Educational institutions established in 1939
Reed
Public middle schools in California
Los Angeles Unified School District schools
1939 establishments in California
Studio City, Los Angeles